(Parliamentary) Committee on Industry and Trade (NU) is a parliamentary committee in the Swedish Riksdag. The committee's areas of responsibility concern Business policies and related research on those terms, along with trade, energy policies, regional development policy, state-owned enterprises and price, and competition conditions.

The committee's Speaker is Tobias Andersson from the Sweden Democrats and the vice-Speaker of the committee is Elisabeth Thand Rinqvist from the Centre Party.

List of speakers for the committee

List of vice-speakers for the committee

References

External links
Riksdag - Näringsutskottet

Committees of the Riksdag